Ioan Popovici (16 August 1857 – 6 August 1956) was a Romanian general and commander of the Romanian 1st Army Corps from 1916 to 1918, during World War I. 

Afterward he rose through the ranks until he became a divisional general in 1916 as World War I was raging, engulfing Romania. He was known as "Provincialul" ("The Provincial") because of his ineptitude.

In World War I, he took command on 3 September 1916 of the First Army Corps, which was subordinated to the First Army, under the command of Ioan Culcer. In September 1916, Popovici fought at the First Battle of Petroșani. The loss suffered by his command a few days later at the Battle of Sibiu led to his forced retirement.

He died in Bucharest in 1956, aged 98.

Works

References

Bibliography
 Falkenhayn, Erich von, Campania Armatei a 9-a împotriva românilor și a rușilor, Atelierele Grafice Socec & Co S.A., București, 1937
 Kirițescu, Constantin, Istoria războiului pentru întregirea României, Editura Științifică și Enciclopedică, București, 1989
 Ioanițiu, Alexandru (Lt. Col.), Războiul României: 1916–1918, vol 1, Tipografia Geniului, București, 1929
 România în războiul mondial 1916-1919, Documente, Anexe, Volumul 1, Monitorul Oficial și Imprimeriile Statului, București, 1934
 Marele Cartier General al Armatei României. Documente 1916–1920, Editura Machiavelli, București, 1996
 Istoria militară a poporului român, vol. V, Editura Militară, București, 1989
 România în anii primului Război Mondial, Editura Militară, București, 1987
 România în primul război mondial, Editura Militară, 1979

1857 births
1956 deaths
People from Galați
Romanian Land Forces generals
Romanian military personnel of the Second Balkan War
Romanian military personnel of World War I
Romanian Army World War I generals